U.C. Sampdoria won their first ever Serie A title, thanks to a remarkable season for a team playing on its absolute peak. Gianluca Vialli was the league top scorer on 19 goals, and Roberto Mancini, Attilio Lombardo, goalkeeper Gianluca Pagliuca plus centre half Pietro Vierchowod were also instrumental in Sampdoria's success story.

Squad

Transfers

Competitions

Serie A

Results by round

Matches

Top scorers
  Gianluca Vialli 19
  Roberto Mancini 12
  Marco Branca 5
  Toninho Cerezo 3
  Alexei Mikhailichenko 3
  Attilio Lombardo 3
  Pietro Vierchowod 3

Coppa italia 

Second round

Third round

Quarterfinals

Semifinals

Final

European Cup Winners' Cup 

Round of 16

Eightfinals

Quarterfinals

European Super Cup

Statistics

References

Sources
  RSSSF - Italy 1990/91

U.C. Sampdoria seasons
Sampdoria
Italian football championship-winning seasons